The National Roller Coaster Museum and Archives (NRCMA) is a United States 501(c)(3) nonprofit organization dedicated to the protection and preservation of historic roller coasters and amusement park artifacts and memorabilia.

Its goals include to interpret, document, archive and share the history of the amusement park industry with present and future generations. The museum is a member of the American Alliance of Museums as well as the International Association of Amusement Parks and Attractions (IAAPA)

History 

The museum was founded in 2009 and storage facility construction began in Plainview, Texas, next to amusement ride manufacturer Larson International, and the museum received its first ride vehicle donations from Busch Gardens Williamsburg and Six Flags Over Texas.

In 2020, the museum completed construction on the Mark Moore Memorial Wing, expanding the facility to over 80,000 square feet.

Vehicle collection 
The museum holds retired roller coaster and other ride vehicles from around the world, including:

 Busch Gardens Williamsburg: Complete train, entry sign and some track sections from The Big Bad Wolf.
 Cedar Point: Mantis stand-up coaster lead car, Disaster Transport bobsled and track section and three Wildcat cars.
 Disneyland: Two ride vehicles from the Matterhorn Bobsleds.
 Hersheypark: Car from Comet, complete train from SooperDooperLooper.
 Kings Dominion: Volcano: The Blast Coaster lead car and track section.
Knott's Berry Farm: Train from Montezooma's Revenge
 Six Flags America: Apocalypse: The Last Stand lead car. It was the first roller coaster built by Bolliger and Mabillard (B&M).
 Six Flags Astroworld: Large section of preserved, Texas Cyclone track.
 Six Flags Over Texas: Texas Giant white train (complete), Intamin freefall car, Chute Out parachute vehicle.

Archives 
The museum stores original ride and attraction blueprints in a climate-controlled storage room at the facility.

References

External links
National Roller Coaster Museum and Archives official website

Roller coasters
Proposed museums in the United States
Museums in Hale County, Texas
Amusement museums in the United States